Rigoberto Cisneros Dueñas (born 15 August 1953) is a Mexican former football defender who played for Mexico in the 1978 FIFA World Cup.

Club career
Cisneros played club football for Toluca, Monterrey, Club Universidad de Guadalajara and Guadalajara.

References

External links
 
FIFA profile

1953 births
Living people
Footballers from Mexico City
Association football defenders
Mexico international footballers
1978 FIFA World Cup players
Deportivo Toluca F.C. players
C.F. Monterrey players
Leones Negros UdeG footballers
C.D. Guadalajara footballers
Liga MX players
Mexican footballers